Drugstore Cowboy is a 1989 American crime drama film directed by the American filmmaker Gus Van Sant. Written by Van Sant and Daniel Yost and based on an autobiographical novel by James Fogle, the film stars Matt Dillon, Kelly Lynch, Heather Graham and William S. Burroughs. It was Van Sant's second film as director.

At the time the film was made, the source novel by Fogle was unpublished. It was later published in 1990, by which time Fogle had been released from prison. Fogle, like the characters in his story, was a long-time drug user and dealer.

The film was theatrically released in the United States on October 6, 1989, and received acclaim from critics.

Plot 
In 1971, 26-year-old Bob Hughes leads a nomadic group of drug addicts—his wife Dianne, his best friend Rick, and Rick's teenage girlfriend Nadine—who travel across the Pacific Northwest robbing pharmacies and hospitals to support their habits.

After stealing from a Portland, Oregon, pharmacy, they drive home to get high, and are visited by David, a local low-life seeking hard-to-find Dilaudid. Bob claims they have none, but offers to trade him morphine for speed. Initially reluctant, David is persuaded to trade and leaves. Later, police officers led by Detective Gentry, who correctly assumes the group is responsible for the pharmacy robbery, raid and wreck their apartment in an unsuccessful search for the stolen drugs, which Dianne has buried outside.

After moving to another apartment, Bob realizes that Gentry has the group under surveillance. Bob proceeds to devise an elaborate ruse which results in one of the policemen, Trousinski, being mistaken for a peeper by a neighbor who shoots and injures him. The next day, a furious Gentry assaults Bob. Believing a hex has been brought upon them, the group goes "crossroading" and robs a drugstore via an open transom. They find their haul includes vials of pure powdered Dilaudid worth thousands of dollars each. Declaring that, "when you're hot, you're hot," Bob convinces Dianne that he should rob a hospital.

During the robbery, Bob is almost captured, and the group returns to their motel to find Nadine has fatally overdosed on a stolen bottle of Dilaudid. According to Bob, she has also put "the worst of all hexes" on them by leaving a hat on her bed. After temporarily storing Nadine's body in the motel's attic, they are alerted by the motel manager that their room was previously booked for a sheriffs' convention and they must check out. Bob, suffering tremendous anxiety and stress-induced visions of handcuffs and prison, sneaks the body out of the motel in a garment bag. Before burying Nadine in a forest, Bob tells Dianne that he is going to get clean and begin a 21-day methadone treatment program. Shocked by Bob's decision, Dianne refuses to join him.

Bob moves into a long-stay motel in Portland and gets a low-level manufacturing job. At the methadone clinic, he encounters an elderly, drug-addicted priest named Tom, whom Bob remembers from his days as an altar boy. Gentry pays a visit to the motel and says that Trousinski has been making threats against Bob, whom Gentry encourages staying sober. Bob later witnesses David bullying a young man who supposedly owes him money. Bob intervenes and lets the man escape, much to David's frustration.

One night, Dianne arrives at the motel and reveals that she is now in a relationship with Rick, the group's new leader. Dianne asks Bob what happened on the road to make him change his life, and he answers that Nadine's death, the hex she put on them, and the possibility of serious prison time contributed to his decision. He reveals a deal he made with a higher power: if he could get Nadine's body out of the motel, past the cops, and into the ground, he would straighten out his life. Bob suggests Dianne stay the night with him, but she declines, and gives Bob a package of drugs before leaving. Bob gives the drugs to Tom (who rejects all of them except for a bottle of Dilaudid). Returning to his room, Bob is attacked by two masked figures, one of whom is David, who thinks he has drugs. Bob tells them that he is clean, but David does not believe this and shoots him. A neighbor phones for help, and Bob is loaded onto a stretcher. Asked who shot him, Bob tells Gentry it was "the hat."

While riding in the ambulance, Bob concludes via a voice-over that he has "paid his debt to the hat" and so can resort to his former lifestyle without breaking his commitment. He is amused by the perceived irony of the police driving him to a hospital — "the fattest pharmacy in town."

Cast 
 Matt Dillon as Bob Hughes
 Kelly Lynch as Dianne Hughes
 James LeGros as Rick
 Heather Graham as Nadine
 Max Perlich as David
 James Remar as Gentry
 Grace Zabriskie as Mrs. Hughes
 William S. Burroughs as Father Tom Murphy

Production 
Tom Waits was Van Sant's first choice to play the lead, although the finance company would not support Van Sant if he had cast him. Officially the reason given was that Waits was appearing in another movie they were financing, although Van Sant has said he suspected the Oscar win of Kiss of the Spider Woman, a film they had also financed, had made them want a lead who could win an Oscar.

Filming locations 
Drugstore Cowboy was filmed mainly around Portland, Oregon, including in an area in the Pearl District that used to be a railyard, with a viaduct going over it. The Lovejoy Columns, which formerly held up the viaduct and feature outsider artwork, are featured in the movie. The initial drugstore scene was filmed at the Nob Hill Pharmacy on NW Glisan Street.

Music

The soundtrack includes songs that are contemporaneous with the film's setting, along with original music by Elliot Goldenthal. It is one of his earliest works; in it, he does not use an orchestra, but a whole range of instruments treated in a synthesizer. The score and soundtrack were also the first that Goldenthal worked on with Richard Martinez, a music producer whose "computer expertise and sound production assistance" became the basis for frequent subsequent collaborations. AllMusic rated this soundtrack three stars out of five.

Side one
 "For All We Know" (4:58) – Abbey Lincoln
 "Little Things" (2:25) – Bobby Goldsboro
 "Put a Little Love in Your Heart" (2:38) – Jackie DeShannon
 "Psychotic Reaction" (3:06) – Count Five
 "Judy in Disguise" (2:56) – John Fred & His Playboy Band
 "The Israelites" (2:47) – Desmond Dekker & The Aces
Side two
 "Yesterday's Jones" (0:45)
 "Morpheus Ascending" (1:17)
 "Monkey Frenzy" (2:20)
 "Wonder Waltz" (1:19)
 "White Gardenia" (1:54)
 "The Floating Hex" (1:37)
 "Mr. F. Wadd" (1:02)
 "Elegy Mirror" (0:48)
 "Panda the Dog" (0:51)
 "Heist and Hat" (1:36)
 "Strategy Song" (2:04)
 "Bob's New Life" (2:48)
 "Clockworks" (0:32)
 "Cage Iron" (1:03)
 "Goodnight Nadine" (1:28)

Reception 
The film was very well received critically and is listed on the Top Ten lists of both Gene Siskel and Roger Ebert, for films released in 1989. On Rotten Tomatoes, it has a 97% approval rating based on 29 reviews, with an average score of 8/10 and a consensus: "Drugstore Cowboy takes us into a violent, transient world with cool, contemplative style". Review aggregator Metacritic assigned the film a weighted average score of 82 based on 15 reviews, indicating "universal acclaim".

In his print review for The Chicago Sun-Times, Ebert gave the film 4 stars out of a possible 4. He described Dillon as offering "one of the great recent American movie performances" and highlighted how the film was successful by portraying the characters not as "bad people [but] sick people" who formed an unorthodox family to cope with "the desperation in their lives". Ebert also singled out Burrough's cameo as "a guest appearance by Death."

Accolades 
Drugstore Cowboy won the following awards:
 L.A. Film Critics Association (1989) — Best Screenplay (Dan Yost, Gus Van Sant)
 National Society of Film Critics (1989) — Best Film, Best Director
 Independent Spirit Award (1989) — Best Male Lead (Matt Dillon), Best Cinematography, Best Screenplay, Best Supporting Male (Max Perlich)
 New York Film Critics Circle (1989) — Best Screenplay

References

External links 

 
 
 Drugstore Cowboy Filming Locations at miskowiec.com

1980s English-language films
1980s American films
1980s drama road movies
1989 films
1989 crime drama films
1989 independent films
American crime drama films
American independent films
American drama road movies
Films based on American novels
Films directed by Gus Van Sant
Films with screenplays by Gus Van Sant
Films scored by Elliot Goldenthal
Films about drugs
Films about heroin addiction
William S. Burroughs
Films set in the 1970s
Films set in 1971
Films set in Portland, Oregon
Films shot in Portland, Oregon
National Society of Film Critics Award for Best Film winners